Bulmer is a surname. Notable people with the surname include:

Bulmer (family), English family
Alex Bulmer, Canadian theatre artist
Esmond Bulmer (born 1935), former British Conservative MP
Bevis Bulmer (1536–1615), mining engineer and speculator
Sir John Bulmer (1481–1537) and Lady Margaret Cheyne Bulmer (n.a.–1537), rebels in the Pilgrimage of Grace
John Bulmer (cricketer) (1867–1917), English cricketer
John Bulmer (born 1938), English photographer and filmmaker
Kenneth Bulmer (1912–2005), prolific British author
Martin Bulmer (born 1943), British sociologist
Michael Bulmer (born 1931), British biostatistician
Ralph Bulmer (soldier), (died 1558), English soldier
Ralph Bulmer (1928–1988), New Zealand anthropologist
Captain Roscoe Carlyle Bulmer US Navy (1874-1919)
Susan Bulmer née Hirsh (17 February 1933 - 6 October 2016) pioneering archaeologist who worked in Papua New Guinea and New Zealand.
William Bulmer (printer) (1757–1830), English printer
John Bulmer Hobson (1883-1969) a prominent member of the Irish Republican Brotherhood involved in planning the Easter Rising